Krupuk kulit ( or , lit: "skin crackers") is a traditional Indonesian cattle skin krupuk (cracker). Traditionally it is made from the soft inner skin of cattle (cow or water buffalo), diced, and sun-dried until it hardens and loses most of its water content. The diced and dried skin are later fried in ample hot cooking oil until they expand in similar fashion with bubble and yield a crispy texture. This fried cattle skin is then sealed in vacuum plastic bags to ensure and prolong its crispiness.

History
Krupuk rambak or krupuk made from cow or buffalo skin, is the oldest-mentioned krupuk variant in ancient Java. According to a culinary historian, krupuk has been around in Java since the 9th or 10th century, written on the Batu Pura inscription as krupuk rambak, which still exists today in Javanese cuisine, usually in krechek, a spicy stew.

Serving

Krupuk kulit is often served as a crispy snack to accompany main meals. In Padang restaurants they are often offered as a side dish for nasi padang or sate padang, and often served with kuah gulai seasoning. In Java, krupuk kulit is the essential ingredients for krechek, a krupuk kulit dish in spicy coconut milk stew.

Variations
Most of krupuk kulit sold in Indonesia are made from cattle skin, either cow or water buffalo (kerbau). However, in some areas with large non-Muslim populations such as Bali, Batak lands, and some Chinatowns in Medan and other cities, pork skin krupuk kulit is also available. Compared to common cow skin crackers, kerupuk kulit babi (pork rinds) have a lighter colour and crumble more easily. There is also a variant which uses frog skin as krupuk kulit kodok.

See also 

Chicharrón
Pork rinds
Prawn cracker, a food of similar texture and appearance made of prawn and starch
Krupuk

Notes

External links 
Industri Kerupuk Kulit Toraja 

Javanese cuisine
Padang cuisine
Deep fried foods
Indonesian snack foods